Thelymitra imbricata, commonly called the broad sun orchid, is a species of orchid that is endemic to Tasmania. It has a single erect, channelled leaf and up to fifteen or more pale to dark or purplish blue, relatively large flowers.

Description
The side lobes are finger-like and have dense, toothbrush-like tufts of white hairs. Flowering occurs from late October to early December. The flowers are long-lasting, insect pollinated and open on warm sunny days.

Taxonomy and naming
Thelymitra imbricata was first formally described in 1998 by David Jones and the description was published in Australian Orchid Research. The name replaced the synonym Thelymitra nuda var. grandiflora Lindl.. The specific epithet (imbricata) is a Latin word meaning "overlapping like roofing-tiles and shingles".

Distribution and habitat
The broad sun orchid usually grows in a range of habitats including open forest, scrubland, grassland and heath in the Tasmanian midlands.

References

External links
 

imbricata
Endemic orchids of Australia
Orchids of Tasmania
Plants described in 1998